Alicia Ann, Lady John Scott, (née Alicia Ann Spottiswoode) (24 June 1810 – 12 March 1900) was a Scottish songwriter and composer known chiefly for the tune, "Annie Laurie", to which the words of a 17th-century poet, William Douglas, were set.

Life
She was the oldest daughter of John Spottiswoode of Berwickshire and his wife Helen Wauchope of Niddrie-Mains. On 16 March 1836 she married Lord John Scott, a younger son of the 4th Duke of Buccleuch, and consequently was known as Lady John Scott. Lord John Scott died in 1860. Under the will of her father, she resumed her maiden name Spottiswoode in 1866, and was sometimes known as Lady John Scott Spottiswoode.

Lady John Scott was a champion of traditional Scots language, history and culture, her motto being 'Haud [hold] fast by the past'. One of her best known works, "Annie Laurie," was published in 1838.  Scott was born at Spottiswoode, Scottish Borders, in the former Berwickshire and died there on 12 March 1900.

Her compositions were published by Paterson & Roy, and included:

Works
Selected works include:

“Annie Laurie”
“Douglas Tender and True” 
“Durisdeer”
“Etterick”
“Farewell to Thee”
“Foul Fords”
“Katherine Logie”
“Lammermoor”
“Loch Lomond”
“Mother, Oh Sing Me to Rest”
“Shame on Ye, Gallants”
"Think on Me"
“When We First Rode Down to Ettrick”
“Within the Garden of My Heart”
“Your Voices Are Not Hush'd”

See also
List of places in the Scottish Borders
List of places in Scotland

References

External links
 
 
 
 Lady John Douglas Scott recordings at the Discography of American Historical Recordings.

1810 births
1900 deaths
19th-century classical composers
19th-century Scottish writers
19th-century British women writers
Women classical composers
Scottish classical composers
Scottish songwriters
19th-century British composers
19th-century women composers
Wives of younger sons of peers